Fibroma of tendon sheath is a benign tumor that presents as a small subcutaneous nodule that slowly increases in size. The tumors often have a multinodular growth pattern, with individual nodules being composed of bland, slender, spindle-shaped cells (myofibroblasts) in a dense, fibrous matrix.” A common microscopic finding is the presence of elongated, slit-like blood vessels. The lesions nearly always arise in the distal portions of the extremities. They often occur on the fingers, hands, toes, or feet. Although they are benign, they may recur in up to 40% of cases.

Although they may be regarded as a tumor of the skin, the lesions arise from tendons and aponeuroses in superficial sites, and are therefore properly classified as in the category "soft tissue tumor." The World Health Organization, 2020, reclassified these tumors as a specific, benign tumor type in a broad category of soft tissue neoplasms termed fibroblastic and myofibroblastic tumors.

The biological nature of Fibroma of tendon sheath is not known, but the category appears to comprise a number of different pathologic processes. It is considered that about one-third of the lesions in this category may be acral variants of the entity, nodular fasciitis.

See also 
 Giant cell tumor of the tendon sheath
 List of cutaneous conditions

References 

Dermal and subcutaneous growths